Tišice is a municipality and village in Mělník District in the Central Bohemian Region of the Czech Republic. It has about 2,400 inhabitants.

Administrative parts
Villages of Chrást and Kozly are administrative parts of Tišice.

Geography
It lies in a flat landscape in the Central Elbe Table. The Elbe River flows along the municipal border.

History
The first written mention of Tišice is from 1400. The village of Kozly was first mentioned in 1052 and Chrást in 1380. All three were separate municipalities until 1960, when they merged.

Sights
The landmark of Tišice is the Church of All Saints. The originally early Gothic church was built in 1352. It was reconstructed in the Baroque style in 1822.

Notable people
Marie Podvalová (1909–1992), opera singer; grew up here

References

External links

Villages in Mělník District